Bhichit Rattakul (born August 30, 1946) is a Thai politician who served as the governor of Bangkok from 1996 to 2000 and the science deputy minister of Thailand. He is the son of former foreign minister and deputy prime minister Bhichai Rattakul and is of Thai Chinese descent.

Early life and educations 
Bhichit earned a Ph.D. in Chemical Engineering from Brigham Young University in 1976 and was instrumental in the September 2000 Thailand visit of LDS Church president Gordon B. Hinckley. As of May 2008, Bhichit serves as Director of the Asian Disaster Preparedness Center, which is run under the auspices of the United Nations.

Honours 
 Knight grand Cross in the Order of the White Elephant.
 Knight grand Cross in the Order of the Crown of Thailand.
 Knight grand Commander in the Order of Chula Chom Klao.
 Knight grand Cross by the Emperor of Japa.

References

External links 
 Asian Disaster Preparedness Center

1946 births
Bhichit Rattakul
Bhichit Rattakul
Brigham Young University alumni
Living people
Bhichit Rattakul
Bhichit Rattakul
Bhichit Rattakul
Bhichit Rattakul
Bhichit Rattakul